Pepeganga Margarita Fútbol Club (usually called Pepeganga Margarita) was a professional club founded on 1985. The club won one Second Division title in 1986–87 season. The club was based in Isla Margarita, Nueva Esparta.

History
In the 1990 Copa Libertadores, the club was eliminated by Independiente in the Round of 16.

Honours
Venezuelan Primera División: 0
Runner-up (1): 1988–89
Venezuelan Segunda División: 3
Winners (1): 1986–87

Performance in CONMEBOL competitions
Copa Libertadores: 1 appearance
1990: Round of 16

External links
Tribute web 

Association football clubs established in 1985
Association football clubs disestablished in 1990
Football clubs in Venezuela
1985 establishments in Venezuela
Defunct football clubs in Venezuela